Baitul Mukarram, also spelled as Baytul Mukarrom, is the National Mosque of Bangladesh. Located at the center of Dhaka, capital of Bangladesh, the mosque was completed in 1968. It has a capacity of 42,000+.

History

The mosque complex was designed by architect, Abdulhusein M. Thariani. In a meeting held at his house on 27 April 1959, owner of then Bawani Jute Mills, Abdul Latif Ibrahim Bawani invited GA Madani, Haji Abdul Latif Bawani, MH Adamji, S Sattar, Muhammad Sadiq, AZN Rezai Karim and Major Umrao Khan. In that meeting he proposed to Major General Umrao Khan, then military administrator of East Pakistan, of building a grande mosque in Dhaka. Umrao Khan agreed to help on building such mosque. Same year, 'Baitul Mukarram mosque committee' had been established and 8.30 acre of land between new Dhaka and old Dhaka had been chosen. At that time, there was a large pond in present mosque's location. It was known as 'Paltan pond. The pond was filled up and on 27 January 1960 then president of Pakistan Ayub Khan commenced the work. Pray for first time took place on Friday, 25 January 1963. On 28 March 1975, the Government of Bangladesh entrusted the management of the mosque to the Islamic Foundation Bangladesh.

The plan included shops, offices, libraries and parking areas within the complex. Though there has been a tradition of dome mosque for Muslim, this building did not maintain the rule of traditional mosque in that time. A Mosque without a dome over the roof of its main prayer hall must have been a unique experiment. The mosque was built when the country was the Part of the Islamic Republic of Pakistan.

in 2008 the mosque was extended, financed by a donation from the Saudi government.

Architecture
The mosque has several modern architectural features whilst at the same time it preserves the traditional principles of Mughal architecture which has for some time been dominant in the Indian sub-continent. Baitul Mukarram's large cube shape was modeled after that of the Ka'abah at Mecca making it a noticeable structure unlike any other mosque in Bangladesh.

Exterior design
The mosque is on a very high platform. The Baitul Mukarram National Mosque's building is eight storied and 99 feet high from the ground level. According to the original plan, the main entrance of the mosque was to be on the eastern side. The 'shaan' on the east is 29,000 square feet with ablution space on its south and north sides. Ablution or Wu’du Place cached an important part when the Baitul Mukarram was begun. The absence of a dome on the main building is compensated by the two superficial domed entrance porticoes, one on the south, and the other on the north. The height of these porticoes consists of three rabbit's foot shaped arches, the middle of which is bigger than the rest.

Interior design
Two patios (roofless inner courtyard) ensure that enough light and air enter the prayer hall of Baitul Mukarram National Mosque. The prayer niché of the hall is rectangular instead of semi-circular. Excessive ornamentation is avoided throughout the mosque, since minimizing ornamentation is typical of modern architecture.

Garden
The garden is laid out in a style borrowed heavily from Mughal gardens, however unlike the traditional Mughal gardens which represent the Islamic Heaven, the garden does not have the Char-Bagh system most likely due to not having enough room for such a garden. The future of this garden is unknown, if the Bangladeshi government extends the mosque, it will most likely have to remove the garden.

Khatibs

Gallery

See also
 Islamic Foundation Bangladesh
 Timeline of Islamic history
 Islamic architecture
 Islamic art
 List of mosques
 Islam in Bangladesh
 Architecture of Bangladesh
 Haqqani Anjuman

References

External links

 Baitul Mukarram the National Mosque of Bangladesh
 Baitul Mukarram National Mosque

Mosques in Dhaka
National symbols of Bangladesh
Mosques completed in 1968
1968 establishments in East Pakistan
History of East Pakistan
20th-century establishments in Bangladesh
Mosques in Bangladesh